Henry Dendy (1800-1881) was born in Abinger, Surrey, England.  
He is best known for his purchase in 1841 of 
, or eight square miles, of land approximately 12 km south-east of Melbourne, Victoria, Australia.  The land, known as Dendy's Special Survey, was purchased from the Crown for one pound an acre under the terms of the short-lived Special Survey regulations.  Dendy established the township of Brighton on his land purchase. Dendy is also associated with Eltham, Victoria where he was an early settler and operated a flour mill.

A depression hit the colony in 1843 and Dendy was bankrupted in 1845.

Dendy died at Walhalla, Victoria on 11 February 1881.

References

1800 births
1881 deaths
Settlers of Melbourne
People from Mole Valley (district)